Alan Ferreira de Souza (born 21 March 1994) is a Brazilian professional volleyball player. He is a member of the Brazil national team and the 2019 World Cup winner.

Honours

Clubs
 FIVB Club World Championship
  Betim 2015 – with Sada Cruzeiro

 CSV South American Club Championship
  Taubate 2016 – with Sada Cruzeiro
  Montes Claros 2017 – with Sada Cruzeiro

 National championships
 2015/2016  Brazilian SuperCup, with Sada Cruzeiro
 2015/2016  Brazilian Cup, with Sada Cruzeiro
 2015/2016  Brazilian Championship, with Sada Cruzeiro
 2016/2017  Brazilian SuperCup, with Sada Cruzeiro
 2016/2017  Brazilian Championship, with Sada Cruzeiro
 2018/2019  Brazilian SuperCup, with SESI São Paulo
 2020/2021  Brazilian Cup, with Sada Cruzeiro

Youth national team
 2011  U19 Pan American Cup
 2012  U23 Pan American Cup
 2012  CSV U21 South American Championship
 2013  FIVB U21 World Championship
 2013  FIVB U23 World Championship
 2014  CSV U23 South American Championship

Individual awards
 2011: U19 Pan American Cup – Best Blocker
 2013: FIVB U21 World Championship – Best Opposite Spiker
 2015: Pan American Cup – Most Valuable Player
 2018: Pan American Cup – Best Opposite 
 2018: Pan American Cup – Best Scorer
 2019: Brazilian Championship – Best Opposite
 2019: CSV South American Championship – Most Valuable Player
 2019: FIVB World Cup – Most Valuable Player

References

External links
 Player profile at Volleybox.net 

1994 births
Living people
Volleyball players from Rio de Janeiro (city)
Brazilian men's volleyball players
Olympic volleyball players of Brazil
Volleyball players at the 2020 Summer Olympics
Brazilian expatriate sportspeople in Russia
Expatriate volleyball players in Russia
Opposite hitters